Channel 17 refers to several television stations:

Canada
The following television stations operate on virtual channel 17 in Canada:
 CFTF-DT-2 in Trois-Pistoles, Quebec
 CIVI-DT-2 in Vancouver, British Columbia
 CIVM-DT in Montreal, Quebec
 CJIL-DT in Lethbridge, Alberta

Mexico
The following regional network and local station operate on virtual channel 17 in Mexico:

Regional networks
Jalisco TV in the state of Jalisco

Local stations
XEFE-TDT in Nuevo Laredo, Tamaulipas

United States
The following television stations, which are no longer broadcasting, formerly branded themselves as channel 17:
 Miami Valley Channel (UPN 17), a cable-only station in Dayton, Ohio

See also
 Channel 17 virtual TV stations in the United States
For UHF frequencies covering 488-494 MHz:
 Channel 17 TV stations in Canada
 Channel 17 TV stations in Mexico
 Channel 17 digital TV stations in the United States
 Channel 17 low-power TV stations in the United States

17